The Mayapada Group is an Indonesian-based conglomerate founded by Dato Sri Tahir in 1986.  Tahir started this with a garment and textile manufacturing business, and four years later, he founded Bank Mayapada . The garment business no longer exists. The bank went public at the Jakarta Stock Exchange and survived the 1997 economic crisis and managed to expand further after the crisis.  With foreign investment partners from the US, UAE and Singapore, the bank now has over 100 branches throughout Indonesia, and in 2007 has been voted as the second best public bank outside state-owned banks by InfoBank magazine, a banking magazine in Indonesia. 
Mayapada also concerns;
  The retail industry through partnership with Duty Free Shoppers owned by LVMH, with shops in Jakarta and Bali.
  The property industry with four office towers in the Jakarta CBD area, Mayapada Tower, Menara Topas, Permata Tower 1  and Sona Topas Tower. In Bali, Mayapada developed Mal Bali Galleria, the largest mall in the island, and all-suites Regent Bali Hotel and Residence in Sanur district.
  The healthcare industry, running a hospital and building another one called Mayapada Hospital.

Tahir is a Christian and lives in Jakarta with his family.  He has also been appointed to the board of trustees at the University of California, Berkeley, becoming the first man from Southeast Asia to hold this position. Through the Tahir Foundation, Tahir has made charitable donations to numerous fields including healthcare, education, legal reformation and has contributed a combined $200 million investment alongside the Bill & Melinda Gates Foundation into tacking social and welfare problems in Indonesia.

Tahir earned his MBA from Golden Gate University in 1987.  His doctorate is an honorary degree from the University of Surabaya in 2008.

Donation
In April 2011, Tahir donated $1 million to the University of California, Berkeley, for international student fellowships for students in the full-time MBA program at Berkeley-Haas. He was a member of the university's board of trustees.

Business units
 PT Banten Media Global Televisi (MYTV)
 PT Metropolitan Televisindo (RTV) (20%, minority)
 PT Intermedia Promosindo (Guo Ji Ri Bao)
 PT Wahana Mediatama (Forbes)
 PT Elia Mediatama Indonesia (Elle)
 PT Bank Mayapada Internasional Tbk (Bank Mayapada)
 PT Sompo Insurance Indonesia (Sompo)
 PT Zurich Insurance Indonesia (Zurich Insurance)
 PT Zurich Topas Life (Zurich Life)
 PT Mayapada Properti Indonesia Tbk
 PT Mayapada Healthcare Group
 PT Sejahteraraya Anugrahjaya Tbk (Rumah Sakit Mayapada)
 PT Mayapada Clinic Pratama (Mayapada Clinic)
 PT Agave Biomedi Investama (Biomedilab)
 PT Precise Pacific Realty (Mayapada Tower)
 Mayapada Tower 1
 Mayapada Tower 2
 Mayapada Banua Center
 The Grand Banua
 Sky Pavilion
 Mayapada Office Tower
 Regent Bali Hotel and Residence
 Fairmont Sanur Beach Bali
 Mall Bali Galleria
 PT Sona Topas Tourism Industry Tbk (Sonatour)
 PT Inti Dufree Promosindo (DFS)
 Tahir Foundation

Former business 
 PT Karya Kreatif Bersama (Topas TV)

References

External links
Mayapada Tower
Bank Mayapada 
Duty Free Shoppers 
Sona Topas Tower
Mayapada Hospital 

 
Banks of Indonesia
Companies established in 1986
Conglomerate companies of Indonesia